Marsha Lane Hatley Farney (born December 15, 1958) is an American businesswoman and former educator from Georgetown, Texas. From 2013 to 2017, she was a Republican member of the Texas House of Representatives for District 20, based in Burnet and Milam counties and a portion of northern Williamson County, a suburb of Austin in the central portion of the state.

In her bid for a third term, Farney was unseated in the Republican primary election held on March 1, 2016, by Terry Wilson, who polled 18,754 votes (54.3 percent) to her 15,809 (45.7 percent).

References

1958 births
Living people
Republican Party members of the Texas House of Representatives
People from Dallas
People from Paris, Texas
People from Austin, Texas
People from Georgetown, Texas
Texas A&M University–Commerce alumni
University of Texas at Austin College of Education alumni
Paris Junior College alumni
American real estate businesspeople
School board members in Texas
Baptists from Texas
Educators from Texas
American women educators
21st-century American women politicians